Partnership for Democracy and Development in Central America (PDD) is a multilateral forum to support democratisation and development in Central America.

See also
 Office of Central American Affairs

International organizations based in the Americas